Daniel Julius Bernstein (sometimes known as djb; born October 29, 1971) is an American German mathematician, cryptologist, and computer scientist. He is a visiting professor at CASA at Ruhr University Bochum, as well as a research professor of Computer Science at the University of Illinois at Chicago. Before this, he was a professor ("persoonlijk hoogleraar") in the department of mathematics and computer science at the Eindhoven University of Technology.

Early life 
Bernstein attended Bellport High School, a public high school on Long Island, graduating in 1987 at the age of 15. The same year, he ranked fifth in the Westinghouse Science Talent Search. In 1987 (at the age of 16), he achieved a Top 10 ranking in the William Lowell Putnam Mathematical Competition. Bernstein earned a B.A. in mathematics from New York University (1991) and a Ph.D. in mathematics from the University of California, Berkeley (1995), where he studied under Hendrik Lenstra.

Bernstein v. United States 

The export of cryptography from the United States was controlled as a munition starting from the Cold War until recategorization in 1996, with further relaxation in the late 1990s. In 1995, Bernstein brought the court case Bernstein v. United States. The ruling in the case declared that software was protected speech under the First Amendment, which contributed to regulatory changes reducing controls on encryption. Bernstein was originally represented by the Electronic Frontier Foundation. He later represented himself.

Cryptography 
Bernstein designed the Salsa20 stream cipher in 2005 and submitted it to eSTREAM for review and possible standardization. He later published the ChaCha20 variant of Salsa in 2008. In 2005, he proposed the elliptic curve Curve25519 as a basis for public-key schemes.  He worked as the lead researcher on the Ed25519 version of EdDSA. The algorithms made their way into popular software. For example, since 2014, when OpenSSH is compiled without OpenSSL they power most of its operations, and OpenBSD package signing is based on Ed25519.

Nearly a decade later, Edward Snowden disclosed mass surveillance by the National Security Agency, and researchers discovered a backdoor in the Agency's Dual_EC_DRBG algorithm. These events raised suspicions of the elliptic curve parameters proposed by NSA and standardized by NIST. Many researchers feared that the NSA had chosen curves that gave them a cryptanalytic advantage. Google selected ChaCha20 along with Bernstein's Poly1305 message authentication code for use in TLS, which is widely used for Internet security. Many protocols based on his works have been adopted by various standards organizations and are used in a variety of applications, such as Apple iOS, the Linux kernel, OpenSSH, and Tor.

In spring 2005, Bernstein taught a course on "high speed cryptography." He introduced new attacks against implementations of AES (cache attacks) in the same time period.

In April 2008, Bernstein's stream cipher "Salsa20" was selected as a member of the final portfolio of the eSTREAM project, part of a European Union research directive.

In 2011, Bernstein published RFSB, a variant of the Fast Syndrome Based Hash function.

He is one of the editors of the 2009 book Post-Quantum Cryptography.

Software 
Starting in the mid-1990s, Bernstein has written a number of security-aware programs, including qmail, ezmlm, djbdns, ucspi-tcp, daemontools, and publicfile.

Bernstein criticized the leading DNS package at the time, BIND, and wrote djbdns as a DNS package with security as a primary goal. Bernstein offers "security guarantees" for qmail and djbdns in the form of monetary rewards for the identification of flaws. A purported exploit targeting qmail running on 64-bit platforms was published in 2005, but Bernstein believes that the exploit does not fall within the parameters of his qmail security guarantee. In March 2009, Bernstein awarded $1000 to Matthew Dempsky for finding a security flaw in djbdns.

In August 2008, Bernstein announced DNSCurve, a proposal to secure the Domain Name System. DNSCurve applies techniques from elliptic curve cryptography to provide a vast increase in performance over the RSA public-key algorithm used by DNSSEC. It uses the existing DNS hierarchy to propagate trust by embedding public keys into specially formatted, backward-compatible DNS records.

Bernstein proposed Internet Mail 2000, an alternative system for electronic mail, intended to replace the Simple Mail Transfer Protocol (SMTP), the Post Office Protocol (POP3) and the Internet Message Access Protocol (IMAP).

Bernstein is also known for his string hashing function djb2 and the cdb database library.

Mathematics 
Bernstein has published a number of papers on mathematics and computation. Many of his papers deal with algorithms or implementations.

In 2001, Bernstein circulated "Circuits for integer factorization: a proposal," which suggested that, if physical hardware implementations could be brought close to their theoretical efficiency, the then-popular estimates of adequate security parameters might be off by a factor of three. Since 512-bit RSA was breakable at the time, so might be 1536-bit RSA. Bernstein was careful not to make any actual predictions, and emphasized the importance of correctly interpreting asymptotic expressions. Several prominent researchers (among them Arjen Lenstra, Adi Shamir, Jim Tomlinson, and Eran Tromer) disagreed strongly with Bernstein's conclusions. Bernstein has received funding to investigate whether this potential can be realized.

Bernstein is also the author of the mathematical libraries DJBFFT, a fast portable FFT library, and primegen, an asymptotically fast small prime sieve with low memory footprint based on the sieve of Atkin (rather than the more usual sieve of Eratosthenes). Both have been used effectively in the search for large prime numbers.

In 2007, Bernstein proposed the use of a (twisted) Edwards curve, Curve25519, as a basis for elliptic curve cryptography; it is employed in Ed25519 implementation of EdDSA.

In February 2015, Bernstein and others published a paper on stateless post-quantum hash-based signatures, called SPHINCS.

In April 2017, Bernstein and others published a paper on Post-Quantum RSA that includes an integer factorization algorithm claimed to be "often much faster than Shor's".

Teaching 
In 2004, Bernstein taught a course on computer software security where he assigned each student to find ten vulnerabilities in published software. The 25 students discovered 44 vulnerabilities, and the class published security advisories about the issues.

See also 

 CubeHash, Bernstein's submission to the NIST hash function competition
 SipHash
 NaCl (Software), a Networking and Cryptography library
 Quick Mail Queuing Protocol (QMQP)
 Quick Mail Transport Protocol (QMTP)

References

External links 

DJBFFT
Daniel Bernstein on the Faculty Page at UIC
Faculty page at Eindhoven University of Technology

1971 births
Courant Institute of Mathematical Sciences alumni
Living people
Modern cryptographers
American computer programmers
American people of German-Jewish descent
20th-century American mathematicians
21st-century American mathematicians
UC Berkeley College of Letters and Science alumni
Computer security academics
University of Illinois Chicago faculty
Computer science educators
Academic staff of the Eindhoven University of Technology
Open content activists
People from East Patchogue, New York